Apostol may refer to:

People
Apostol is an East European name and name element derived from Ancient Greek ἀπόστολος "apostle", and therefore found mainly in Christian societies and cultures.

Given name
 Apostol Mărgărit (1832–1903), a Romanian school teacher and writer
 Apostol Meksi (born in 1825–date of death unknown) an Albanian doctor, folklorist and patriot
 Apostol Muzac (born 1987), a Romanian football player
 Apostol Petkov (1869–1911), a Bulgarian revolutionary
 Apostol Tnokovski (born 1982), a Macedonian product designer

Surname
 Constantin Apostol (1903–1996), a Romanian equestrian
 Danylo Apostol (1654–1734), the Hetman of the Left-bank Ukraine
 Eugenia Duran Apostol (born 1925), a Filipino journalist
 Gheorghe Apostol (1913–2010), a Romanian politician
 Gina Apostol (born 1963), Philippines-born American writer
 Ioan Apostol (born 1959), a Romanian luger
 Iulian Apostol (born 1980), a Romanian professional football player
 Jadwiga Apostoł (1913–1990), Polish resistance leader
 Justin Apostol (1921–1991), a Romanian footballer
 Nicolas Apostol (born 1999), a Canadian professional soccer player
 Ștefan Apostol (born 1974), a Romanian professional football player
 Tom M. Apostol (1923–2016), an American analytic number theorist
 Tyson Apostol (born 1979), an American professional cyclist and three-time Survivor contestant.
 William Apostol (born 1992), an American guitarist and bluegrass musician

Other
 Epistle, a book used in Eastern Orthodox worship
 a barangay in San Felipe, Zambales Province, Philippines

See also
 Apostle (disambiguation)
 El Apóstol
 Apostolic (disambiguation)
 Muravyov-Apostol (disambiguation)

Romanian-language surnames
Romanian masculine given names